LDS High School (previously known as Salt Lake Stake Academy or Latter-day Saints' High School, and sometimes spelled Latter-day Saints High School) was a secondary school in Salt Lake City, Utah operated by the Church of Jesus Christ of Latter-day Saints (LDS Church). The school was closely associated with Latter-day Saints' University, the last vestiges of which are now Ensign College, formerly known as LDS Business College. Both trace their beginnings to the Salt Lake Stake Academy, which started in 1886. The LDS High School name was adopted in 1927.

In 1931, LDS High School was closed, leaving about 1,000 students to attend public high schools, most notably the newly built South High, which opened in the fall of that year. The closure was a late example of a process of closure of most LDS-run secondary schools in the Utah area.

Notable alumni
Gordon B. Hinckley (1928), 15th President of the LDS Church
Lenore LaFount (1926), wife of George W. Romney; First Lady of Michigan (1963–69); mother of Presidential candidate Mitt Romney
Lynn S. Richards, Utah lawyer, politician, and leader in the LDS Church
George W. Romney (1926), American businessman and politician; Governor of Michigan (1963–69); father of Presidential candidate Mitt Romney
Rulon Jeffs, Mormon fundamentalist
Henry S. Kesler, movie and television producer; grandson of Joseph F. Smith.

References

External links
LDS Business College
Church Educational System
The Church of Jesus Christ of Latter-day Saints

Church Educational System
Defunct Christian schools
Defunct organizational subdivisions of the Church of Jesus Christ of Latter-day Saints
Defunct schools in Utah
Educational institutions disestablished in 1931
Latter Day Saint schools
Schools in Salt Lake City
The Church of Jesus Christ of Latter-day Saints in Utah